The 2015 FIVB Volleyball Men's U23 World Championship was held in Dubai, United Arab Emirates, from 24 to 31 August 2015. This was the second edition of the tournament.

Competition formula
The competition format will see the 12 teams split into two pools of six teams playing in round robin format. The semifinals will feature the top two teams from each pool.

Qualification
The FIVB Sports Events Council confirmed a proposal to streamline the number of teams participating in the Age Group World Championships on 14 December 2013.

Pools composition
Teams were seeded following the Serpentine system according to their FIVB U21 World Ranking as of December 2014. FIVB reserved the right to seed the hosts as head of pool A regardless of the U21 World Ranking. Rankings are shown in brackets except the hosts who ranked 72nd.

Squads

Venues

Pool standing procedure
 Number of matches won
 Match points
 Sets ratio
 Points ratio
 Result of the last match between the tied teams

Match won 3–0 or 3–1: 3 match points for the winner, 0 match points for the loser
Match won 3–2: 2 match points for the winner, 1 match point for the loser

Preliminary round
All times are UAE Standard Time (UTC+04:00).

Pool A

|}

|}

Pool B

|}

|}

Final round
All times are UAE Standard Time (UTC+04:00).

5th–8th places

5th–8th semifinals

|}

7th place match

|}

5th place match

|}

Final four

Semifinals

|}

3rd place match

|}

Final

|}

Final standing

Awards

Most Valuable Player
  Egor Kliuka
Best Setter
  Murat Yenipazar
Best Outside Spikers
  Egor Kliuka
  Gökhan Gökgöz

Best Middle Blockers
  Ivan Demakov
  Samet Güneş
Best Opposite Spiker
  Metin Toy
Best Libero
  Yonder Garcia

See also
2015 FIVB Volleyball Women's U23 World Championship

References

External links
Official website
Final Standing
Awards
Statistics

FIVB Volleyball Men's U23 World Championship
FIVB Volleyball Men's U23 World Championship
FIVB Volleyball Men's U23 World Championship
FIVB Volleyball Men's U23 World Championship
International volleyball competitions hosted by the United Arab Emirates